The men's team sprint competition at the 2020 European Speed Skating Championships was held on 10 January 2020.

Results
The race was started at 21:38.

References

Men's team sprint